A list of buildings and structures in Djibouti: